The gens Plaguleia was an obscure plebeian family at ancient Rome.  Only one member of this gens is mentioned by ancient writers, although a few others are known from inscriptions.

Origin
The nomen Plaguleius belongs to a large class of names ending in -eius, which is typically, although not exclusively of Oscan derivation.  The only similar word in Latin seems to be plagulus, a curtain, suggesting that the nomen could possibly be occupational, referring to a curtain-maker, although that would more regularly be plagularius.

Members

 Plaguleius, a partisan of Publius Clodius Pulcher.
 Gaius Plaguleius Ampliatus, built a tomb at Rome for his mother, Claudia Psyche, and his wife, Julia Hermione.
 Gaius Plaguleius C. l. Fortunatus, a freedman buried at Rome between AD 1 and 30.
 Plaguleia Glaphyra, buried at Rome, in a tomb built by Lucius Licinius Anteros.
 Plaguleia A. (f.?) Prima, buried at Rome.
 Gaius Plaguleius Ɔ l. Trophimus, a freedman named in an inscription from Rome.

See also
 List of Roman gentes

References

Bibliography
 Marcus Tullius Cicero, De Domo Sua.
 Dictionary of Greek and Roman Biography and Mythology, William Smith, ed., Little, Brown and Company, Boston (1849).
 Theodor Mommsen et alii, Corpus Inscriptionum Latinarum (The Body of Latin Inscriptions, abbreviated CIL), Berlin-Brandenburgische Akademie der Wissenschaften (1853–present).
 George Davis Chase, "The Origin of Roman Praenomina", in Harvard Studies in Classical Philology, vol. VIII (1897).
 John C. Traupman, The New College Latin & English Dictionary, Bantam Books, New York (1995).

Roman gentes